Sandra  is a female name, which is often used as a short form for Alexandra or Cassandra.  Alexandra is a feminine form of the male name Alexander, which is a romanization of the Greek name Ἀλέξανδρος Alexandros.  It is generally interpreted to mean "protector of man" or "defender of man". 

The name Cassandra is also from the Greek (: "she who entangles men").  Cassandra is known in Greek mythology, as the daughter of King Priam and Queen Hecuba of Troy.  She was loved by Apollo and given the gift of prophecy but when she did not fall in love with him, he placed a curse on her so that no one would believe her predictions.

See also
 List of people named Sandra
 Sander (name)
 Sondra
 Sandro
 Xandra (disambiguation)
 Xander

References

English feminine given names
North American given names
Given names of Greek language origin